Marion is a census-designated place and unincorporated community in Flathead County, Montana, United States. Its population was 886 as of the 2010 census. Marion has a post office with ZIP code 59925. 

The Great Northern Railway created Marion in 1891 as the terminus of a short spur line that ran west from Kalispell. Between 1892 and 1902, this would be part of the Great Northern Main Line between Columbia Falls and Libby through Haskell Pass. The post office in Marion was established in 1892.

Located just off of U.S. Route 2, Marion is 21 miles from Kalispell. The town is next to Little Bitterroot Lake.

The railroad between Kalispell and Marion was abandoned in the 1940s. Part of it is now Great Northern Historical Trail.

Demographics

Education
Marion School District 54 educates students in the area. They are known as the Panthers.

Marion has a public library, a branch of the Flathead County Library.

Climate
This climatic region is typified by large seasonal temperature differences, with warm to hot (and often humid) summers and cold (sometimes severely cold) winters.  According to the Köppen Climate Classification system, Marion has a humid continental climate, abbreviated "Dfb" on climate maps.

References

Census-designated places in Flathead County, Montana
Census-designated places in Montana
Unincorporated communities in Montana
Unincorporated communities in Flathead County, Montana